The discography of Ken Nordine encompasses 15 studio albums released between 1955 and 2005. Nordine made several guest appearances on other artists recordings and his tracks featured on several compilations.

Albums
1955 – Passion in the Desert (FM)
1957 – Word Jazz (Dot)
1958 – Son of Word Jazz (Dot)
1958 – Love Words (Dot) – also released as The Voice of Love (Hamilton)
1959 – Next! (Dot)
1960 – Word Jazz Vol. II (Dot)
1967 – Colors (Philips)
1967 – Ken Nordine Does Robert Shure's Twink (Philips)
1979 – Stare with Your Ears (Snail) 
1984 – Triple Talk (Snail)
1986 – Grandson of Word Jazz (Snail)
1991 – Devout Catalyst (Grateful Dead)
1993 – Upper Limbo (Grateful Dead)
2001 – Transparent Mask (Asphodel)
2005 – The Eye Is Never Filled (DVD, Snail)

Compilations
1959 – My Baby (Dot) compilation of Word Jazz and Son Of Word Jazz
1968 – The Classic Collection: The Best of Word Jazz Vol. 3 (Dot)
1971 – How Are Things in Your Town? (Blue Thumb) - 2LP
1990 – The Best Of Word Jazz, Vol. 1 (Rhino) CD compilation of Word Jazz, Son Of Word Jazz, Next! and Word Jazz Vol. II
2005 – You're Getting Better: The Word Jazz Dot Masters (Hip-O Select) - 2CD

Guest appearances 
1955 – The Shifting Whispering Sands – Billy Vaughn (Dot) (credited as Ken Nordene on this release)
1957 – Concert in the Sky – Teddy Phillips and His Orchestra (Decca)
1958 – Sounds in Space (RCA Victor SP-33-13)
1962 – Radio Rebus (US Army Recruiting Service)
1968 – H. P. Lovecraft II – H. P. Lovecraft (Philips) – "Nothing's Boy"
1997 – Fun for the Whole Family– Lord Runningclam (Bottom Heavy) / 1998 (Moonshine Music) – "Faces in the Night" and "Flibberty Jib"
1998 – Sound Museum – Towa Tei (Elektra) – "The Sound Museum"
2000 – A Dub Plate of Food Vol. 2 – DJ Food (Ninja Tune)
2000 – Kaleidoscope – DJ Food (Ninja Tune) – "The Ageing Young Rebel"
2000 – Xen Cuts – Various Artists – DJ Food (Ninja Tune) – "The Ageing Young Rebel"
2002 – Cago – Dead Man Ray (Virgin) – "Blue Volkswagen 10:10 AM"
2007 – Excellent Italian Greyhound – Shellac (Touch & Go) – "Genuine Lulabelle" [uncredited]
2012 – The Search Engine DJ Food – "All Covered In Darkness"(sampled vocal)

Compilation tracks 
1959 – Deejay's Choice: 25 Top Album Performances on Dot (Dot) – "My Baby"
1959 – Excerpts from the Original Soundtrack of Another Evening with Fred Astaire (Chrysler) – "My Baby"
1965 – A Child's Introduction to the Classics (Childcraft/Wing) – "Barber of Seville"
1973 – Original Early Top 40 Hits (Paramount) – "The Shifting Whispering Sands, Part 1" with Billy Vaughn
1988 – Stay Awake: Various Interpretations of Music from Vintage Disney Films (A&M)
1991 – Train of Thought: Stories, Music & Eclectic Audio Entertainment, Vol.1 (Com Audio) – "Mr. City"
1992 – The Beat Generation box set (Rhino) – "Reaching Into In" and "Hunger Is From"
1993 – A Chance Operation: The John Cage Tribute (Koch) – "A Cage Went in Search of a Bird"
1994 – Incredibly Strange Music, Vol. 2 (Asphodel) – "Flesh," "Green" and "Yellow"
1995 – All Day Thumbsucker Revisited (Blue Thumb/GRP) – "Roger"
1995 – Chop Suey Rock (Hot & Sour) – "Hot" as Ken Nordine and His Kinsmen
1995 – Monster Sounds and Boppin' Tracks (Marginal) – "Strollin' Spooks"
1997 – Closed on Account of Rabies: Poems and Tales of Edgar Allan Poe (Mercury) – "The Conqueror Worm"
1999 – The Annoying Music Show's The Annoying Music Show CD
2000 – The Annoying Music Show's The Annoying Music Show Holiday CD – "Ken Nordine Says Jim Nayder's Name"
2002 – The Best of the Beat Generation (Rhino) – "My Baby"

Related recordings 
1951 – Incredible But True Radio (Columbia)

References 

Discographies of American artists